Friedrich Nikolai Georg Freiherr von Korff (5 April 1773 – 11 September 1823) was a Baltic German cavalry general, he commanded corps in 1812–1814 during the Napoleonic Wars. In 1807 he led a cavalry brigade in the 4th Division at Eylau. During the French invasion of Russia in 1812 he commanded the II Cavalry Corps at Borodino. In 1813 he led the I Cavalry Corps at the Katzbach and Leipzig. In 1814 he led his horsemen at Laon, Fère-Champenoise and Paris.

References

Russian generals
Russian commanders of the Napoleonic Wars
1773 births
1823 deaths